The England women's cricket team toured Australia in October and November 2017 to play the Australia women's national cricket team to contest the Women's Ashes. The teams played one Test match, three Women's One Day Internationals (WODIs) and three Women's Twenty20 Internationals (WT20Is). The Women's Ashes were held by Australia prior to the start of the series.

Since 2013, the series has consisted of a multi-format series with points awarded for each of the matches. Two points was awarded for each WODI or WT20I win, four points to the Test winner, or two points to each team in the event of the Test being a draw.

In August 2017, Australia's captain Meg Lanning announced that she would miss the series, after undergoing surgery on her shoulder. The following month, Rachael Haynes was named as her replacement. In September 2017, Cricket Australia confirmed that the first match, the WODI at Allan Border Field, Brisbane, had sold out, the first time a Women's Ashes fixture had done so.

The Test match was played as a day/night fixture, the first time a Women's Test has been played as such. The WODIs were part of the 2017–20 ICC Women's Championship, with Australia winning the WODI series 2–1. The Test match ended as a draw, with Ellyse Perry of Australia scoring the first double century in a Women's Ashes Test. Australia Women retained the Ashes, after they won the first of the WT20I fixtures, leaving them with an unassailable lead. England Women went on to win the WT20I series 2–1, with the series tied 8–8 across all formats.

Squads

Ahead of the Test match, England added Kate Cross, Natasha Farrant and Amy Jones to their squad. Prior to the WT20I fixtures, Lauren Cheatle was ruled out of the matches with a back injury, while Sarah Aley, Delissa Kimmince and Molly Strano were all added to Australia's squad.

WODI series

1st WODI

2nd WODI

3rd WODI

Three day match

Cricket Australia Women's XI vs England Women

Only Test

T20 tour match

Australia Governor-General's XI vs England Women

WT20I series

1st WT20I

2nd WT20I

3rd WT20I

References

External links
 Series home at ESPN Cricinfo

2017–20 ICC Women's Championship
International cricket competitions in 2017–18
November 2017 sports events in Australia
October 2017 sports events in Australia
The Women's Ashes
Women's international cricket tours of Australia
2017 in English women's cricket
2017–18 Australian women's cricket season
Australia 2017